DJ Sedrak (Sedrak Davidian, ; 1963 in Aleppo – January 17, 2008 in Yerevan) was the first radio-DJ in Armenia, "Hai FM" and "City FM" radio programs director, musician, also famous for his "Bon appetite" TV-program.

In 1980s he entered to the Yerevan State Medical University, then become an Armenian radio director and first time used DJ skills for modern Armenian music translation. He was one of the founding members of the Republic of Armenia branch of Armenian Democratic Liberal Party (Ramgavar).

References

External links
В Армении скончался известный радиоведущий Седрак Давидян, NewsArmenia, January 18, 2008 (in Russian)

Syrian people of Armenian descent
1963 births
2008 deaths
Armenian DJs
Syrian emigrants to the Soviet Union